Bernd das Brot is a puppet character, star mascot and cult figure of the German children's television channel KI.KA, currently featured in the programs Bernd das Brot, Bravo Bernd, and the KI.KA late night loop programme.

Role on KI.KA 

Bernd is a depressed, grumpy, curmudgeonly, constantly bad-tempered, surly, fatalistic, melancholic loaf of pullman bread speaking in a deep, gloomy baritone. He is small, rectangular and golden brown with hands directly attached to his body, rings around his eyes and a thin-lipped mouth. According to himself, he belongs to the species "Homo Brotus (= 'Breadus') Depressivus". His favourite activities include staring at his south wall at home, learning the pattern of his woodchip wallpaper by heart, reading his favourite magazine The Desert and You, and enlarging his collection of the most boring railway tracks on video. Bernd sympathizes firstly with himself. His favorite expression is Mist., used in much the same way as the English "crap". His other catchphrases are: "I would like to be left alone," "I would like to leave this show," and "My life is hell."

According to the official version, the short-armed bread character made its first appearance as part of an advertising campaign for a bakery chain. When the campaign turned out unsuccessful, Bernd was forced to apply for job at the KI.KA (more specifically, the MDR member of the ARD) which is also the reason for his permanent scowl. Bernd himself does not want to appear on television and thinks it is a "dirty business".

Bernd interacts with two co-main characters. One is the chatty Chili dem Schaf (Chili the Sheep), a female, yellow sheep with flaming red hair. Chili, the show's Gastgeberin (hostess), is a Stuntschaf (stuntsheep) who finds it exciting to have close calls with accidents. The other main character is the show's technical expert, the always pleasant Briegel der Busch (Briegel the Bush), a green, bespectacled bush with flowers and leaves in lieu of hair. Briegel is an inventor who loves to build complicated devices that almost inevitably explode of their own accord - these devices are usually what is sold on the show. In contrast to Bernd, they enjoy adventures and the excitement of life. Bernd doesn't hide that he doesn't think very highly of his colleagues, refusing to call them by name (instead calling them "Bush" and "Sheep" respectively) while they treat him as their best friend, even give him nicknames such as "Berndi".

The first show starring Bernd, Chili and Briegel was the 2001 pastiche Tolle Sachen, die einzige Werbesendung auf KI.KA (English: Great things, the only advertising show on KI.KA) (KI.KA is actually a public, commercial-free channel, similar to its parent channels ARD and ZDF, and PBS Kids in the United States). In this show Chili and Briegel would advertise an object that would be tested by a "randomly" chosen tester that would invariably turn out to be Bernd. Shows with Bernd, Chili and Briegel also include pastiches of Robin Hood, Star Trek (owned by ViacomCBS, owner of the German version of Nickelodeon, KI.KA's competitor) Western and fairy tales.

Production

KI.KA had asked several entertainment companies to create a new sheep mascot, including The Jim Henson Company. Krappweis and Cöster were dining in a pizzeria one night and scribbled sketches on a napkin while watching a bread basket. Cöster said "Bread is funny". Krappweis obtained a square-shaped loaf of bread to which he then gave the face of his colleague Norman Cöster, who also shares many personality traits with Bernd. Upon that idea, Bernd and lateron the other figures were developed  

Similarly, Krappweis himself served as archetype for Chili the Sheep, who - just like Krappweis himself in his earlier years - gets on people's nerves with nonsensical stunts, while Briegel the Bush was modeled after a further producer of the series, Michael Briegel. He, too, is said to have a predisposition for wreaking havoc - according to an anecdote, he once set fire to an office computer.

The actual character designs of Bernd and Briegel are the work of cartoonist Georg Graf von Westphalen. Bernd is played and voiced by the puppeteer Jörg Teichgraeber.

Reception

Although Bernd was created in 2000, and has been on television since 2001, he first rose to fame in 2003. Until then, KI.KA was sharing its satellite channel frequency with the Franco-German channel Arte, but after 2003, KI.KA got the frequency for itself. As a children's channel, KI.KA did not air programs between 9pm and 6am, but instead of putting a simple test card, programmers decided to air a late night loop program starring Bernd every night. In the 2005 version of the program, Bernd constantly stated that he had had enough of television and was going home and advised the viewers to do likewise. The night loop program continues to this day. This program allowed late-night adult viewers to discover Bernd; those viewers would then discuss the bread loaf on Internet forums, buy Bernd-das-Brot merchandising and CDs although none of them were advertised, and participate in Bernd-themed KI.KA competitions alongside children. How many adult viewers watch Bernd remains unknown, because KI.KA is a children's channel whose programs officially end at 9pm and thus no audience measurement is made for KI.KA during the night, at the time the Bernd night loop program airs. Furthermore, KI.KA's main audience being children, adults are not counted even in audience measurements performed during official airing times.

Bernd has thousands of child and adult fans in Germany and is greatly popular. Jeremy Wasser of Spiegel Online wrote that "Bernd epitomized the fundamental pessimism felt by many, if not most, Germans about, well, almost everything. (...) That Germans would take to a character like Bernd and be willing to engage in this form of self-analysis and self-mockery should, in my view, be commended. That the people of the land of Goethe and Schiller would choose as their guide in this spiritual exploration a clinically depressed loaf of bread, is, perhaps, just another improbable element of the German Zeitgeist". David Frogier de Ponlevoy, also of Spiegel Online, commented that Bernd shows were "a successful mix of slapstick and irony that irresistibly brings families in good mood." The Süddeutsche Zeitung wrote that the idea of making a depressed loaf of bread the star of a children's channel was crazily funny.

In 2004, Bernd das Brot won the Adolf Grimme Award for representing "the right to bad mood" and resisting "the reign of good mood that endlessly drones out of the television". The Deutsche Welle commented that "most likely the jury realized just how subversive Bernd das Brot's attitude is when many human beings these days are willing to do almost anything to achieve fame and fortune on TV". The Adolf Grimme Award is the German equivalent of the Emmy Award.

Kidnapping

In fall 2007, KI.KA donated a statue of Bernd to the German city of Erfurt, Thuringia, where KI.KA is based, to celebrate the channel's tenth anniversary. It stands on the Fischmarkt (English: Fish market), the city's main square, next to the neo-gothic town hall and is a tourist attraction. On 21 January 2009, the figure disappeared. It was next seen in a video released on YouTube, in which a group of activists calling themselves "Team 129 A" claimed responsibility for its kidnapping. Bernd expressed solidarity with the activists in the video, prompting several media to joke that he had developed Stockholm syndrome.

The activists were squatting in the abandoned Topf and Sons factory, where ovens and gas chamber ventilation systems for the Auschwitz-Birkenau extermination camp were manufactured. The occupation was to prevent the city of Erfurt from redeveloping the area into apartments and office space. They opened a literary cafe and were giving lecture events. The negotiations broke down when the activists rejected an offer for alternative housing. The squatters themselves denied involvement in Bernd's kidnapping, claiming a group of sympathizers might be responsible for it.

The public broadcaster Mitteldeutscher Rundfunk, which owns the rights to Bernd das Brot, quickly forced YouTube to remove the video from the site by having their lawyers claim copyright infringements. Steffen Kottkamp, head of KI.KA, strongly criticized Bernd's kidnapping. Krappweis called for the figure's return, stating that "Kidnapping, even of bread loaves, is the wrong means of achieving political goals". Fans set up an online petition calling for the return of the statue in Erfurt.

The Bernd figure was eventually found intact by chance on 1 February 2009 in the basement vault of a disused barracks in Nohra, between Erfurt and Weimar. According to Spiegel Online, five children had been searching the area to collect period artifacts before it was demolished. They then discovered the Bernd statue and alerted KI.KA and the police. How the statue ended up there is unknown. After forensics experts confirmed that it was the genuine statue, it was carried out of the basement by six police officers and ultimately brought back to its original location on the Fischmarkt in front of Erfurt's town hall.

Works

Music

 2003: Tanzt das Brot (Single)
 2003: Rockt das Brot (Album)Chili-TV-Rap / Ich habe ein kleines Cha Cha Cha / Ich sage NEIN / Zu spät / Bluesbrot Bernd / Briegel, komm / Ich will wieder heim / Tanzt das Brot / Saulaut (gesungen von Chili dem Schaf) / Bielefeld / Easy Briegel / Schreit das Schaf (gesungen von Chili dem Schaf) / Buschig, brotig, chilischarf / Geht einfach alle weg / Dubididum
 2004: Bernds Balkon (Single)
Exklusives on Sampler:
 2001: Was geht ab? (on the Sampler KiKA-Hits)
 2007: Tanzt das Brot (Party-Mix 2007) (on the Sampler KiKA Hits – Das Beste aus den ersten 10 Jahren)
 2007: P… wie Party (on the Sampler KiKA Geburtstagsparty)
 2008: Fußball Fußball Hey Hey Hey (on the Sampler KiKA Fußball-Hits)

Video games
 Kikania (2001, Ubisoft)
 Bernd das Brot und die Unmöglichen (2013, Deep Silver)

References

External links
 
  (in German)

German television personalities
Children's television characters
Puppets
Fictional food characters
Mascots introduced in 2000
Male characters in television
Male characters in advertising
Television mascots
Grimme-Preis for fiction winners